Leesville is an unincorporated community in Colusa County, California. It lies at an elevation of 1434 feet (437 m).  It had a post office from 1874 to 1920. The town is named for Lee Harl, a pioneer landowner.

Climate
According to the Köppen Climate Classification system, Leesville has a warm-summer Mediterranean climate, abbreviated "Csa" on climate maps.

References

Unincorporated communities in California
Unincorporated communities in Colusa County, California